Jakob Makarashvili (born December 28, 1985) is a Georgian freestyle wrestler. He competed in the men's freestyle 74 kg event at the 2016 Summer Olympics, in which he was eliminated in the quarterfinals by Jabrayil Hasanov.

References

External links
 

1985 births
Living people
Male sport wrestlers from Georgia (country)
Olympic wrestlers of Georgia (country)
Wrestlers at the 2016 Summer Olympics